Jebal Warrab (جبل وراب)
 is a mountain of Saudi Arabia.

At 2,948 m (9,672 ft), it is the 4th highest mountain of Saudi Arabia.

Its name means Mount Rap, and it is in the Sarwat Mountains in the Asir region of Saudi Arabia.

References

Warrab